The Joy Girl is a 1927 American two-strip Technicolor silent comedy film directed by Allan Dwan, released by Fox Film Corporation, starring Olive Borden, Neil Hamilton, and Marie Dressler, and based on the short story of the same name by May Edginton.

Plot
Jewel Courage (Borden) rejects a suitor (Hamilton), whom she thinks is a chauffeur, in favor of a man she thinks is a millionaire. It transpires that the roles were, in fact, reversed; Hamilton is the millionaire and the other man a chauffeur. Jewel is crushed, but manages to do well for herself in business, until the real millionaire and she find themselves reconciled.

Cast

Olive Borden as Jewel Courage
Neil Hamilton as John Jeffrey Fleet
Marie Dressler as Mrs. Heath
Mary Alden as Mrs. Courage
William Norris as Herbert Courage
Helen Chandler as Flora
Jerry Miley as Vicary
Frank Walsh as Hugh Sandman
Clarence Elmer as Valet
Peggy Kelly as Isolde
Jimmy Grainger Jr. as Chauffeur
Betty Byrne (uncredited)
Ursula Fisher (uncredited)
Edna Wilson (uncredited)

Production
Location filming took place in Palm Beach, Florida. Either part or all of the film was shot in Technicolor. It was the last film to be shot in the second Technicolor process ("System 2"), before the company's implementation of a new, improved format in 1928.

Preservation status
A print of The Joy Girl with Czech intertitles is held at the Museum of Modern Art.

See also
List of early color feature films

References

External links

Still at Getty Images

1920s color films
Films based on works by British writers
Films directed by Allan Dwan
American silent feature films
1927 films
1927 comedy films
Fox Film films
Silent films in color
Silent American comedy films
Films based on short fiction
1920s American films
1920s English-language films